Clivina attenuata is a species of ground beetle in the subfamily Scaritinae. It was described by Herbst in 1806.

References

attenuata
Beetles described in 1806